Mark Whitaker Izard (December 25, 1799 – August 1866) was an Arkansas Democratic politician who served as the 2nd Governor of the Nebraska Territory. He also served in the Arkansas Senate. 

Izard was born in Lexington, Kentucky to Nicholas H and Rebecca (Whitaker) Izard on December 25, 1799.  His family were among the early settlers of the Huntsville, Alabama area and he was educated there in public schools. Izard married the daughter of George Shackleford of Charleston, South Carolina in 1823. The next year he moved his family to frontier town of Mount Vernon, Arkansas.  Over the next several years he acquired an appreciable amount of land and slaves.

Mark Izard served in the Arkansas Territorial Council and as a delegate to the Arkansas Constitutional Convention of 1836. He was a member of both the Arkansas State Senate 1836, 1838–1840, and 1850–1853; he served as President of the Arkansas Senate. Izard also served in the Arkansas House of Representatives and served as its speaker. He became the governor of the Nebraska Territory in 1855 to 1857. He died in 1866 and is buried in Forrest City, Arkansas.

References

Citations

Sources

1799 births
1866 deaths
Arkansas state senators
Members of the Arkansas Territorial Legislature
Speakers of the Arkansas House of Representatives
Democratic Party members of the Arkansas House of Representatives
Nebraska Democrats
Governors of Nebraska Territory
19th-century American politicians